Qarib Qarib Singlle is a 2017 Indian Hindi-language romantic comedy film co-written and directed by Tanuja Chandra and produced by Zee Studios, JAR Pictures and Sutapa Sikdar. The film stars Irrfan Khan and debuting Malayalam actress Parvathy Thiruvothu in the lead roles and had a worldwide release on 10 November 2017.

The story revolves around Jaya Shashidharan, a widow, who lives alone and works at an insurance policy company. One day, she meets Yogi, on an online dating website called abtaksinglle.com. They both journey around the country to meet Yogi's three ex-girlfriends, during which they fall for each other.

Plot 

Jaya Shashidharan is a 35-year-old widow leading a loveless, monotonous life, still grieving the loss of her husband Manav. She works in an insurance firm. On being needled constantly by her friends and family, she enrolls herself on a dating website, "AbTakSinglle.com". Although she initially receives weird messages, she eventually fixes a date with a decent profile holder Yogi.

She meets Yogendra "Yogi" Kumar Devendra Nath Prajapati, a lesser known poet and a happy-go-lucky, open-hearted and talkative person who is actually quite wary of the internet. His published book of poems hasn't sold that well. Yogi helps Jaya get rid of the weird message senders on the dating site. Although initially Jaya wanted to avoid Yogi, she now agrees to meet him again. During their conversation he tells her about his past 3 girlfriends who still yearn for him. Jaya challenges him to meet them to find out whether that is in fact the truth. Yogi asks Jaya if she will accompany him on this quest. She reluctantly accepts, ready to pose as his ‘cousin’ if someone asks. Jaya informs everyone that she is going out of town for work purposes. She tells her brother Ashish, who is studying at Princeton University that she has enrolled for a meditation camp where the people have to take a vow of silence for the duration of their stay and hence will be offline for the period.

They head to Dehradun first. Yogi misses the flight, frightening Jaya. He meets her eventually at the airport and they commence their journey. On the way he asks for some water but she refuses saying she doesn't share her bottle.

Jaya has booked their stay in an Ashram highly recommended on a travel website. They later attend a spectacular Ganga Aarti. At night they have a telephonic conversation from their adjoining rooms and Yogi falls asleep instantly to a restless Jaya's chagrin. Next day they meet Radha, his first girlfriend who is now happily married. Jaya introduces herself as his cousin, and is surprised when Yogi is addressed as a maternal uncle to Radha's kids. The guests are taken on a River Rafting expedition by Radha's husband who owns an adventure company. Later in the evening they gather around the bonfire and Yogi serenades them with a beautiful melody.

Jaya and Yogi return to their rooms and again speak on the phone. When Yogi starts snoring Jaya enters his room through the common door and puts the receiver back in place. Emotionally drained, she forgets to latch the door behind her.

In the morning she is belting out Yogi's song from the previous evening, in her room. Yogi tries to give tune to the song and leans on the door gives away as he inadvertently staggers into her room. Jaya screams at him to get out as he has seen her naked.

After the awkward encounter they board the Fairy Queen train and head to Jaipur. Yogi, the food connoisseur in search of pakoras, misses the train, again scaring Jaya. Her laptop bag is left with Yogi who boards another train by mistake. He opens the video calling page on her buzzing laptop. Jaya's brother Ashish finds him staring at the screen and calls him a "laptop thief." A flustered Yogi shuts the screen. Here Jaya is furious with Yogi who constantly keeps calling her. She doesn't answer his calls. Jaya checks into the resort and enjoys her evening on a Safari with a foreign tourist. Yogi having turned mountains to reach the resort feels jealous on finding Jaya with the said tourist.

Initially Jaya decides to abort her trip due to Yogi's whimsical ways. But he explains to her that their way of looking at and leading life is different is all. Jaya relents and on their way to meet Anjali, Yogi's second girlfriend, buys "sleeping pills" from a medical store. She gobbles down 3–4 pills to shut the inquisitive Yogi. She soon goes under influence of the sedatives and begins to act funny.

Anjali having changed her traditional avatar has emerged as a glamorous woman. It is revealed that she abandoned her anniversary party to make it to the meeting. Jaya again having introduced herself as Yogi's aunt's daughter, compliments Anjali and continues to act out under influence of the pills. Yogi walks Anjali back to her home, where a star gazing party is underway. She hugs and gives him a peck. An inebriated Jaya sees this and rants at Yogi calling him a cheat, hints of her developing feelings for him starting to show. Finally exhausted, she crashes on him and falls asleep under the starry sky.

Next morning a surprised Jaya finds herself in Yogi's room. A tender moment is disturbed when Anjali calls Yogi multiple times. Jaya listening to her flirtatious talk gets upset and leaves the room. Anjali reminds Yogi how she herself was introduced as his cousin when they were together in the past. She tells Yogi that Jaya is a keeper.

Next morning the duo head to Gangtok, to meet his third girlfriend. A still seething Jaya reveals that she has accompanied Yogi only so that she could meet her ex-boyfriend from college, now a very famous person in the city. This revelation upsets Yogi but he goes along with the plan. They travel on a helicopter loaned by Jaya's ex-boyfriend. Jaya has a retching incident on the ride. Once on the ground she goes to the restroom to freshen up. There she meets a few elderly ladies from the beauty parlour she frequents, among them Mrs. Saluja. When they start mocking Jaya for her loveless life, she retorts saying she has been traveling with a date and since it didn't work out she now is going to meet up with an ex. This shuts them up.

At the hotel Jaya puts on a beautiful saree and waits for her ex-boyfriend at a café, while Yogi books his return ticket and prepares to leave. They accidentally meet and Jaya chides Yogi stating that he is a selfish man stuck on his past and they should now part ways. Yogi replies that she is the same and as he departs asking if her ex-boyfriend is nearly as single as they both are. Jaya feels the sting of his remarks and proceeds to call everybody who till now took her for granted and asks them to call her back only if they want a friend and not a sitter. She removes her password which was "Manav135" from all her electronic devices.

Jaya meets her ex—boyfriend and they spend some lovely time together at his home. Yogi goes to see his third girlfriend who is a dance teacher. From the window he watches her dance lessons in progress. He leaves a note at her doorstep, which salutes her for her victories and then silently goes away. Back at the hotel he packs his bags and goes to Jaya's room when he finds her Laptop. She has created a webpage of Yogi's poems. He is touched by the gesture. Her brother turns up on the chat and asks if Yogi is her boyfriend? Realizing his feelings for Jaya, Yogi runs out. He gets into a ropeway car while searching for Jaya. Their paths cross and Jaya calls to him from an opposite car. An excited Yogi finally doesn't miss and makes the jump into the cable Car. The couple look at each other, smiling in a knowing way.

Yogi asks her if she would share her water bottle with him, which she willingly does.

Cast 
 Irrfan Khan as Yogendra "Yogi" Kumar Devendra Nath Prajapati
 Parvathy Thiruvothu as Jaya Shashidharan
 Neha Dhupia as Anjali
 Pushtiie Shakti as Radha
Avneet Kaur as a teen girl at the clothing store
 Brijendra Kala as Hotel Receptionist
 Aman Sharma as Salil, Taxi Driver
 Isha Sharvani as Gauri
 Luke Kenny as Sidkong
 Navneet Nishan as Mrs. Saluja
 Nidhi Joshi as Meghna
 Siddharth Menon as Ashish, Jaya's Younger Brother
 Babil Khan as young man on bike at the medical store (Titles scene, uncredited)
 Anud Singh Dhaka as DJ Chintu

Production

Development 

Qarib Qarib Singlle is based on a story which was originally written many years ago as a radio play by director Tanuja Chandra's mother Kamna Chandra. In August 2016, it was reported that Irrfan Khan would be the lead actor in Tanuja Chandra's next film which would be a romantic comedy about an odd couple falling in love on a road trip. The production team approached Richa Chadha, Kalki Koechlin and Pooja Hegde for the film but talks didn't materialize with any of them. While scouting for the lead actress of the film, Gazal Dhaliwal, who is the co-writer of the film, suggested the name of Parvathy Thiruvothu, an actress who was supposed to work in a Vidhu Vinod Chopra film written by Gazal Dhaliwal but could not as the film got shelved. In February 2017, it was confirmed by Parvathy Thiruvothu herself that she would be making her debut in Hindi cinema with Tanuja Chandra's film opposite Irrfan Khan.

Filming 

The principal photography of the film began in February 2017 in Bikaner, Rajasthan. The film was shot across multiple locations of Dehradun, Delhi, Alwar, Bikaner, Rishikesh, Roorkee and Gangtok.

Soundtrack 

The music of the film is composed by Anu Malik, Rochak Kohli and Vishal Mishra while the lyrics have been penned by Raj Shekhar, Hussain Haidry and Varun Grover. The first song of the film titled, "Khatam Kahani" sung by Nooran Sisters, was released on 13 October 2017. The second song of the film, "Tu Chale Toh" which is sung by Papon, was released on 19 October 2017. The third single to be released was "Jaane De" which is sung by Atif Aslam was released on 25 October 2017. The soundtrack was released by Zee Music Company on 10 November 2017.

Critical reception 

The film received mainly positive reviews. On review aggregator website Rotten Tomatoes, Qarib Qarib Singlle has an approval score of 86% based on 7 reviews with an average rating of 7.2 out of 10. Rajeev Masand of News18 gave the film a rating of 3 out of 5 and said that, "Yogi and Jaya won my heart, and I wouldn't have minded spending more time in their company." Neil Soans of The Times of India praised the performances of the leading actors of the film, Irrfan Khan and Parvathy and gave the film a rating of 3.5 out of 5. The critic concluded his review by saying that, "As long as you don't expect fireworks, enjoy this sweet film that will leave you smiling." Sweta Kausal of Hindustan Times was impressed with the performances of Irrfan Khan and Parvathy and said that Qarib Qarib Singlle is "A heartfelt film where Parvathy outshines a superb Irrfan". The critic gave the film a rating of 4 out of 5. Namrata Joshi of The Hindu applauded the movie as well as the acting performances of Irrfan Khan and Parvathy saying that, "QQS is a happy confluence of many things besides an absolutely entrancing, candid and un-self-conscious Khan who makes acting seem utterly easy and effortless."

Saibal Chatterjee of NDTV gave the film a rating of 3 out of 5 and said that, "Qarib Qarib Singlle might put off average film goers but if you see value in a film that breaks away from norm and derives strength from understatement rather than flashy storytelling methods, your search ends here." Shubhra Gupta of The Indian Express complimented the performance of leading actress Parvathy saying that, "Qarib Qarib Singlle's beating heart is Parvathy (the lead actor of the terrific Malayalam film Take Off). She is such a breath of fresh air, such a break from the dressed up dolls of Bollywood." About the movie the critic said that, "This Irrfan Khan starrer is a well-crafted, winsome rom-com" and gave the film a rating of 3.5 out of 5. Murtaza Ali Khan (film critic) of Huffington Post said that, "Qarib Qarib Singlle is a beautiful slice-of-life film about solitude and companionship that takes time to cast a spell on the viewers but once they are hooked there is no escape from its irresistible charm." and gave the film a rating of B+. Rachit Gupta of Filmfare gave the film a rating of 4 out of 5 and said that Qarib Qarib Singlle is "A light but spectacularly adroit romantic comedy." Stutee Ghosh of The Quint gave the film a rating of 3.5 out of 5 and said that, "The screenplay by Tanuja Chandra and Gazal Dhaliwal is a mature and sensitive meditation on life and love, but the unhurried pace at which the story unfolds might disappoint some."

Accolades

References

External links 
 
 

2017 films
2010s Hindi-language films
2017 romantic comedy-drama films
Indian romantic comedy-drama films
Films shot in Rajasthan
Films shot in Sikkim
Films shot in Uttarakhand
Films directed by Tanuja Chandra